Esther Cornelia Brand (née van Heerden; 29 September 1922 – 20 June 2015) was a South African athlete. She competed at the 1952 Summer Olympics and won a gold medal in the high jump, placed 20th in the discus throw. She was the first African woman to win an Olympic track and field event. Brand was ranked world #1 in the high jump in 1940–41 and 1952, #3 in 1951 and #5 in 1939. In 1941 she equaled the world record of 1.66 m.

Born in Springbok, Northern Cape, she attended Maitland High School in Cape Town, South Africa. She died after a fall in 2015.

References

External links

 In memoriam

1922 births
2015 deaths
People from Nama Khoi Local Municipality
Afrikaner people
South African people of Dutch descent
South African female high jumpers
South African female discus throwers
Athletes (track and field) at the 1952 Summer Olympics
Olympic gold medalists for South Africa
Olympic athletes of South Africa
Medalists at the 1952 Summer Olympics
Olympic gold medalists in athletics (track and field)
Sportspeople from the Northern Cape